Patricia Poblete Benett (6 June 1946 − 31 March 2022) was a Chilean economist who served as minister during the first government of Michelle Bachelet (2006–2010).

References

1946 births
2022 deaths
University of Chile alumni
20th-century Chilean economists
Christian Democratic Party (Chile) politicians
21st-century Chilean politicians
21st-century Chilean women politicians
Housing ministers of Chile
Government ministers of Chile
Women government ministers of Chile
People from Temuco